Todd Meringoff (born May 7, 1974) is an American former professional tennis player.

A native of Long Island, Meringoff was a varsity tennis player with Harvard University from 1993 to 1996.

Meringoff competed on the professional tour in the late 1990s, reaching career best rankings of 641 in singles and 343 in doubles. His best performance on the ATP Tour was a quarter-final appearance in doubles at the 1999 Waldbaum's Hamlet Cup in Long Island, partnering Harvard teammate Andrew Rueb.

ITF Futures titles

Doubles: (6)

References

External links
 
 

1974 births
Living people
American male tennis players
Harvard Crimson men's tennis players
Tennis people from New York (state)
People from Long Island